Bitter Springs Group is a Precambrian fossil locality in Australia, which preserves microorganisms in silica. Its preservational mode ceased in the late Precambrian with the advent of silicifying organisms.

Preserved fossils include cyanobacteria microfossils.
This locality also has been claimed to contain eukaryotic green algae preservation, though this interpretation is debated.

References

External links 
 University of California - Berkeley page on the Bitter Springs formation

Geologic groups of Oceania
Geologic formations of Australia
Springs of Australia
Precambrian Australia
Geology of the Northern Territory
Paleontology in Australia
Lagerstätten
Precambrian fossils